Nuestro Amor (English: Our Love) is the second studio album by Mexican Latin pop group RBD. The album was released on September 22, 2005, in Mexico, selling over 127,000 units in its first seven hours of release in the country, and 160,000 in the first week, enough for it to be certified Platinum almost instantly. It was eventually certified 3× Platinum and Gold in Mexico. In the United States, the album was released on October 4, 2005, and peaked at number 88 on the Billboard 200 chart. It also spent three weeks in a row at number one on the Top Latin Albums chart, selling over 100,000 units just in its first week of release. The album was released in Spain on October 30, 2006, and has been certified 2× Platinum. The album was nominated for a Latin Grammy in the "Best Pop Album by a Duo/Group with Vocals" category at the 2006 Latin Grammy Awards.

On March 2, 2006, a "Diamond Edition" of the album was released, which included the original 14 tracks, plus an interactive CD including wallpapers, videos, screensavers, plus two new unreleased tracks. The group eventually recorded a Portuguese-language version of the album for their fanbase in Brazil; this edition was released on May 22, 2006, and was titled Nosso Amor Rebelde.

Background, release and composition 
Having released their first live album, Tour Generación RBD En Vivo, on July 19, 2005, the band decided to release their second studio album less than three months later on September 22, 2005, in Mexico and on October 4, 2005, in the United States. On March 2, 2006, a 'Diamond Edition' of the album is released, which includes interactive content and the Portuguese-language song "Quando O Amor Acaba". On May 22, 2006, the Portuguese version of the album is released in Brazil, titled Nosso Amor Rebelde.

Nuestro Amor incorporates pop and Latin pop in its music, with rhythmic and melodic stylings. It was produced by Armando Ávila, Max di Carlo, Carlos Lara and Pedro Damián. Among its tracks, the album contains "Me Voy", a Spanish cover version of "Gone", by American recording artist Kelly Clarkson. "Gone" was originally released on Clarkson's multi-platinum album Breakaway (2004). "Me Voy" keeps the same meaning as the original – a heartbroken woman who gains pride and a sense of self-worth forces herself to get over the one who harmed her. The track "Feliz Cumpleaños" is as well a Spanish cover version, this time of Swedish singer Mikeyla's "Happy Worst Day". Both songs were eventually also recorded in English for RBD's English debut, Rebels (2006), and its Japanese deluxe edition, We Are RBD!

Promotion

Singles 

On August 25, 2005, the first single off the album was released, the title-track "Nuestro Amor". The song was used as the opening theme of the second season of the telenovela Rebelde. The music video for the single was filmed in Pedregal de San Ángel, Mexico and was directed by Amín Azali. The song became RBD's second song to reach the top ten of the Billboard Hot Latin Songs chart in the United States, reaching a peak of No. 6 and becoming the album's highest-charting song in the country.

"Aún hay algo" was released as the album's second single on November 18, 2005. In 2006, the song wong the award for "Catchiest Tune" at the 2006 Premios Juventud. The song debuted and peaked at No. 9 on the Billboard Latin Pop Songs chart and at No. 24 on Billboard Hot Latin Songs.

The album's third single was "Tras de mí", which was released on January 23, 2006. Although the song did not have an accompanying official music video, it was very well accepted among the public. RBD performed the song at the 7th Annual Latin Grammy Awards (2006).

The fourth and last single from the album was the ballad "Este corazón", which was released on March 10, 2006. The song was used as the opening theme of the 3rd season of Rebelde. The song won the award for "Best Ballad" also at the 2006 Premios Juventud.

Tour 
The album's promotional tour, titled "Tour Generación 2006" or "Nuestro Amor Tour", started on February 21, 2006, at the Pantages Theater in Los Angeles, California and later continued throughout the United States. RBD managed to fill out venues such as the Madison Square Garden in New York City, the American Airlines Arena in Miami, Florida and the Los Angeles Memorial Coliseum in Los Angeles, California. This last particular concert was filmed and broadcast through various television channels in the US.

On September 20, 2006, a promotional leg of the tour, titled "RBD Tour Brasil 2006", visited more than thirteen Brazilian cities. In October 2006, RBD performed in Rio de Janeiro at the Maracanã Stadium to 50,000 fans and became the first Spanish-language musical act to perform a concert as a main act in the history of the stadium. The tour reached its end on March 14, 2007, at the concert performed in Corpus Christi, Texas. That same year, RBD wins the award for "Latin Tour of the Year" at the 2007 Latin Billboard Music Awards.

Live performances 
As part of the promotion for Nuestro Amor, RBD presented themselves and performed in a number of outlets in various countries. In 2005, the band first performed on the Mexican TV show Otro Rollo the album's first single and title track "Nuestro Amor". On November 13, 2005, they presented a benefit concert in the Estadio Azteca in Mexico, where they performed "Aún hay algo" and "Nuestro Amor". On November 17, the group appears in the "El Evento 40", an event organized by the Mexican radio program Los 40 Principales, which was broadcast through the Ritmoson Latino music channel. On February 23, 2006, they perform "Nuestro Amor" at the 2006 Premios Lo Nuestro Awards and on May 13, 2006, they perform it again at the 24th TVyNovelas Awards.

Later in 2006, the group performs at the Exa TV concert in Monterrey, Mexico and participated on the MTV Latinoamérica program Rock Dinner, which premise consists in bringing fans closer to their favorite artists; the group shared an evening with a young Mexican fan and also performed the single "Aún Hay Algo". In the 2006 edition of Walmart Soundcheck, a performance series by the Walmart chain to promote albums being released, the band sang "Tras de mí", which was the single being promoted at the time. On April 11, 2006, the group again visits Otro Rollo, where they now performed "Qué Hay Detrás" and "Este corazón".

In August 2006, RBD appears on the Chilean program Mekano to perform "Nuestro Amor" and "Aún Hay Algo", then on October 1, 2006, they visited Brazil and performed the mentioned tracks on the show Domingo Legal. In late October, the band again performs at an Exa TV concert, but this time in Guadalajara, Mexico, where they now performed the hits "Este Corazón" and "Tras De Mí", among others.

On November 2, 2006, RBD performs the single "Tras De Mí" at the 7th Annual Latin Grammy Awards. On November 14, the band appears on the American TV show Don Francisco Presenta, where they perform "Nuestro Amor". On November 21, they present themselves once more on Otro Rollo, this time to perform "Tras De Mí". In December, the group appears at the Teletón México to perform the album tracks "Así Soy Yo", "A Tu Lado", "Fuera", "Qué Fue Del Amor", "Me Voy" and the singles "Nuestro Amor", "Aún Hay Algo" and "Este Corazón". Lastly, long after the album's promotion ended, on February 1, 2008, the band perform "Nuestro Amor" once more on the festivities prior to Super Bowl XLII.

Commercial performance 
Nuestro Amor garnered great success in North America. The album reached number-one on the Mexican Albums Chart, and was certified platinum only seven hours after being released for sales of over 127,000 copies. Eventually, the album was certified 3× platinum + gold by AMPROFON for sales of 350,000 copies in Mexico. In the United States, the album became RBD's first to reach the number-one spot on the Billboard Top Latin Albums chart, while on the main Billboard 200 albums chart it peaked at No. 88, even higher than their debut, Rebelde. With that, the RIAA granted the album a 2x Latin platinum certification for its sales of 120,000 copies in the country.

In Europe, the album also achieved a welcome reception. Nuestro Amor debuted at No. 6 on the albums chart in Spain, eventually peaking at No. 3 and spending 32 weeks on the chart. That allowed PROMUSICAE to grant the album a 3× platinum certification for sales of 200,000 copies in Spain.

In South and Central America the album was well received since its release. In Brazil, the album reached No. 1 on the Brazilian Albums Chart, where ironically its Portuguese-language version peaked at No. 22 later on. Nuestro Amor was also certified in Costa Rica, where it received a Gold certification for the sales of 5,000 copies in the country.

Track listing

 Notes
"Me Voy" is the Spanish cover version of Kelly Clarkson's "Gone", originally released on Clarkson's multi-platinum album Breakaway (2004).
"Feliz Cumpleaños" is the Spanish version of Mikeyla's "Happy Worst Day".
"Liso, Sensual" was originally released on their live album, Tour Generación RBD En Vivo.

Personnel
Credits adapted from the album's liner notes.

Recorded locations
 Los Angeles, California 
 Mexico City, Mexico 
 Mixtlán, Mexico

Mixed in
 Los Angeles, California 

Vocals
RBD – all vocals
Clair Gómez – additional chorus vocals
Pepe Garza – additional choir vocals

Musicians

Armando Ávila – all instruments
Migliano Paglinio – bass guitar
Kyle Sokoloff – drums

Javier Calderón – guitars , Gibby Tyler, Max di Carlo
Max di Carlo – keyboards

Production

Camilo Lara – A&R, executive producer
Melissa Mochulske – A&R coordination
Armando Ávila – arrangement, mixing, producer, recording, vocal direction
Güido Laris – arrangement, recording, vocal direction
Carlos Lara – arrangement, chorus arrangement, music direction, producer
Max di Carlo – arrangement, music direction, producer, programming
René Cárdenas – engineer
Migliano Paglinio – engineer
Pedro Damián – executive producer
Luis Luisillo Miguel – associate producer
Emilio Ávila – executive musical producer
hulahula.com.mx – graphic design
OM Entertainment – management
Marisol Alcelay – marketing, product manager
Rodolfo Vázquez mastering
Juan Carlos Moguel – mixing, recording, vocal direction
Kitaro Mizei – mixing
Amín Azali – music video director 
Olga Laris – photographer
Jorge González – production assistant
Jorge González Montaut – production coordinator
Carolina Palomo Ramos – production coordinator
Carlos Valdés – recording, vocal direction
Michkin Boyzo – recording, vocal direction
Andrew Rose – recording assistant
Iván Machorro – vocal direction assistant

Accolades

Charts

Weekly charts

Year-end charts

Certifications and sales

Release history

See also
List of certified albums in Romania

References

RBD albums
2005 albums
Articles containing video clips